Olaias is a station on the Red Line of the Lisbon Metro. The station is located on Rua de Olivença southeast of Avenida Engenheiro Arantes e Oliveira in the Olaias neighbourhood to the north east of central Lisbon.

History 
The architectural design is by Tomás Taveira and the installation art was created by Pedro Cabrita Reis, Graça Pereira Coutinho, Pedro Calapez and Rui Sanchez.

Connections

Urban buses

Carris 
 756 Olaias ⇄ Rua da Junqueira
 793 Marvila ⇄ Estação Roma-Areeiro

See also 
 List of Lisbon metro stations

References

External links 

Red Line (Lisbon Metro) stations
Railway stations opened in 1998
1998 establishments in Portugal